The 1904 Metropolitan Rugby Union season was the 31st season of the Sydney Rugby Premiership. It was the fifth season run for clubs that represented a district. Eight clubs (seven representing a district, the remaining club representing Sydney University) competed from May till September 1904. The season culminated in the fourth district premiership, which was won by Sydney University. Sydney University were crowned premiers by virtue of finishing the season on top of the table.

Teams 
Eight clubs contested the season; seven clubs representing a district and one club representing Sydney University.

Season Summary 
The 1904 Sydney Rugby Premiership was the most successful on record. The attendance of the public at the various matches was, on the average, the greatest yet known in Sydney football. In nearly every district there were young players coming into First Grade, developing play through lessons learnt from the games against the visiting British team.

For the first time in thirteen years, Sydney University carried off the premiership without any question of legitimacy. The team were one of the best during the first round of games, but their performance slipped during the second round. However, the team were worthy premiership winners despite their drop in form. It was a popular victory for the old club.

North Sydney finished the season in the runners-up position and could have won the premiership if they had not lost key players to the NSW tour of Queensland. Astonishingly, the team were only able to score 14 tries throughout the regular games compared to over twice that amount for the Varsity. In the end, they lost the premiership by one competition point.

South Sydney were considered the most dangerous of all of the teams. They were some of the most cleverest players in the competition displaying control, excellent tackling and smart tactics. Their weak point was their three-quarter line who, if they had performed better, may have given the team the premiership. South Sydney lost the premiership by the slim margin of two points.

Ladder

Ladder Progression 

 Numbers highlighted in blue indicates the team finished first on the ladder in that round.
 Numbers highlighted in red indicates the team finished in last place on the ladder in that round

Statistics

Points

Tries

Lower Grades 
The MRFU also conducted Second Grade and Boroughs competitions this season.

Second Grade 
Ten teams participated in the Second Grade competition: the eight First Grade clubs entered a team each, in addition two Boroughs clubs, Gipps and Manly, were permitted to each enter a team. At the end of the regular games, North Sydney finished at the top of the ladder. The season concluded with a final between Sydney University and Glebe. The game resulted in a scoreless draw, with both teams declared joint premiers.

Boroughs Competition 
Eighteen teams participated in the Boroughs Competition. The teams were split into two divisions of nine teams. In Division A was North Sydney, Willoughby, Mosman, Manly, East Sydney, Surry Hills, Redfern, Balmain and Gipps. In Division B was Marrickville, University, Waterloo, Rockdale, Glebe, Annandale, Leichhardt, Rozelle and Ashfield. At the end of the regular games, North Sydney finished at the top of Division A and Marrickville finished at the top of Division B. The final saw East Sydney beat Marrickville 6 points to 5 to take the premiership.

Participating Clubs

Footnotes

References

 Sydney Club Rugby History.
 "Football". Referee (Sydney, NSW: 1886 - 1939). 1904-09-14. p. 8.

1904 in Australian rugby union
Rugby union competitions in New South Wales